Ganba Bhagdu Desai was an Indian politician from Goa. He was a former member of the Goa, Daman and Diu Legislative Assembly, representing the Canacona Assembly constituency from 1963 to 1967 and 1972 to 1977.

Career
Desai had contested in the 1963 Goa, Daman and Diu Legislative Assembly election from the Canacona Assembly constituency on the Maharashtrawadi Gomantak Party (MGP) ticket and emerged victorious, he served from 1962 to 1967. 

He then successfully contested in the 1972 Goa, Daman and Diu Legislative Assembly election from the same consistency on the MGP ticket and defeated United Goans (Sequiera Group) candidate, P. D. Shrirang Padmanaba by a margin of 2,433 votes. He served for five years from 1972 to 1977. This marked Desai's last election participation in his political career.

Notes

References

Year of birth missing
Year of death missing
Maharashtrawadi Gomantak Party politicians
Goa, Daman and Diu MLAs 1972–1977
People from South Goa district
Indian politicians
20th-century Indian politicians
Goa, Daman and Diu MLAs 1963–1967